Granite Vale is a rural locality in the City of Townsville, Queensland, Australia.

Geography 
The locality is bounded by the ridge of the Hervey Range to the west. There are a number of named peaks in the locality (from north to south):

There is a small section of the Pinnacles National Park in the north-west of the locality but most of the national park is in the neighbouring locality of Hervey Range. There is a small section of the Mingela State Forest in the south-east of the locality but the forest is predominantly in neighbouring Calcium.

Settlement Pocket is a neighbourhood in the centre of the locality near Settlement Creek.

Peach Hollow is a neighbourhood in the south of the locality near the Reid River.

The Springs is a natural spring.

The land use is predominantly grazing on native vegetation.

History 
The locality was named and bounded on 27 July 1991.

Education 
There are no schools in Granite Vale. The nearest primary school is The Willows State School in Kirwan to the north-east. The nearest secondary school is Thuringowa State High School in Condon to the north-east.

References 

City of Townsville
Localities in Queensland